Casino Cinema is a Spike programming block hosted by Steve Schirripa and Beth Ostrosky. The show, which was played around the commercial breaks of a film, featured the hosts (plus a guest player) teaching the audience how to play a casino game.

Partial listing of guests featured on Casino Cinema 

 Criss Angel
 Tobin Bell
 Tom Berenger
 Jordana Brewster
 Christian Cage
 Jessica Canseco
 David Cross
 Corey Feldman
 Forrest Griffin
 Artie Lange
 Method Man
 Jim Norton
 Grace Park
 Vincent Pastore
 Natalie Portman
 Dennis Rodman
 Kurt Russell
 M. Night Shyamalan
 Kevin Smith
 Shawnee Smith
 Scott Stapp
 Callie Thorne

Partial listing of the films featured on Casino Cinema 
 Bloodsport
 The Cutter
 Dr. No
 Drop Zone
 Fight Club
 For Your Eyes Only
 Ghost Ship
 Hot Shots! Part Deux
 Kickboxer
 Lethal Weapon
 Lethal Weapon 2
 Point Break
 Red Dawn
 Rocky IV
 Sin City
 Sniper (1993)
 Super Troopers
 The Texas Chainsaw Massacre (2003)
 Today You Die
 Top Gun

See also
 Dinner and a Movie (similar program on TBS)

References

External links
 Casino Cinema on IMDb

Year of television series debut missing
2000s American television series
Spike (TV network) original programming
Television shows about gambling
American motion picture television series
English-language television shows